Willoughby Run is a tributary of Marsh Creek in Adams County, Pennsylvania in the United States.

Willoughby Run flows southward between Herr Ridge and McPherson Ridge through the Gettysburg Battlefield.

In popular culture 
This article was a topic of conversation in the third episode of series one of the web series "Two Of These People Are Lying" hosted by The Technical Difficulties.

References

External links 
List of rivers of Pennsylvania

Gettysburg Battlefield
Tributaries of the Monocacy River
Rivers of Adams County, Pennsylvania
Rivers of Pennsylvania